Cavadürli railway station is a railway station in the municipality of Klosters-Serneus, in the Swiss canton of Grisons. It is an intermediate stop on the  Landquart–Davos Platz line of the Rhaetian Railway.

Services
The following services stop at Cavadürli:

 RegioExpress: service every two hours between Landquart and Davos Platz.
 Regio: limited service between Landquart and Davos Platz.

References

External links
 
 

Railway stations in Switzerland opened in 1890
Railway stations in Graubünden
Rhaetian Railway stations